The  Lega Nazionale Professionisti B (Italian for National Professionals League B), commonly known as LNPB or Lega B (B League), is the governing body that runs the second tier of professional football competitions in Italy, the Serie B. It was previously known as Lega Nazionale Professionisti Serie B or just Lega Serie B.

It was founded on 7 July 2010, following a split between Serie A and Serie B clubs, which led to the dissolution of the Lega Calcio and creation of two new leagues, the Lega Serie A and Lega Serie B respectively. Since April 2011, Lega Serie B has joined the European Professional Football Leagues association.

Competition

League

There are 20 clubs in Serie B since 2019, restoring the situation which existed before 2003. They were 22 during the first eight years of the Lega B. During the course of a season (generally from August to May) each club plays the others twice (a double round robin system), once at their home stadium and once at that of their opponents, for a total of 38 games. Teams receive three points for a win and one point for a draw; no points are awarded for a loss. Teams are ranked by total points; the club with the most points is crowned champion at the end of each season. If two teams are equal on points, they're ranked by points scored in head-to-head matches, then by goal difference in said games, then by goal difference in all games and then by total numbers of goals scored. If still equal, teams are deemed to occupy the same position. However, if following the application of the above-mentioned tiebreaker criteria there is still a tie for the championship, for relegation, or for qualification to the play–offs, positions will be decided by drawing of lots. The two higher placed teams, plus the winner of play-offs involving the third to sixth placed clubs, are promoted to the Serie A, while the bottom three teams from Serie A are relegated in their stead. At the lower end of the table, the three bottom clubs, along with the loser of play-offs involving the 16th and 17th placed teams, are relegated to the Serie C, with four sides from said league joining Serie B in their place.

Cup

The Lega Serie B clubs participate in the Coppa Italia, which is organized by the Lega Serie A.

Youth competitions
Youth teams of Lega Serie B clubs can play in the Campionato Primavera 2 and the Coppa Italia Primavera, which are organized by the Lega Serie B and Lega Serie A respectively. However, they can join the Campionato Primavera 1, as the Serie A teams can join the Primavera 2, under an ordinary system of promotions and relegations, and the same thing can happen with the Lega Pro’s teams playing the Campionato Primavera 3.

List of Lega Serie B presidents
 Andrea Abodi 2010–2017
 Mauro Balata 2017–

Official Match Ball
2010–11 Nike T90 Tracer
2011–12 Nike Seitiro
2016–17 Puma evoPOWER 2.1
2017–present Kappa Kombat

References

External links
 Lega B official website

Serie B
B
2010 establishments in Italy
Professional sports leagues in Italy